Joseph John Thoder, Jr. (born January 25, 1956 in Bethlehem, Pennsylvania) is Interim Chair and John W. Lachman Professor of Orthopaedics and Sports Medicine at Temple University School of Medicine.

Career
Graduating from Moravian College in Bethlehem, Pennsylvania with a bachelor of science degree in chemistry in 1977, he attended Temple University School of Medicine (Philadelphia) in 1982.  Upon completing his internship at Episcopal Hospital, he began his residency in orthopaedic surgery at Temple University Hospital.

References

1956 births
Living people
American sports physicians
American people of Italian descent
People from Bethlehem, Pennsylvania
Physicians from Philadelphia